Richard Bernard "Dick" Hammer  (July 17, 1930 – October 18, 1999) was an American athlete, firefighter, and actor.

Early life and education
Born in Long Beach, California, Hammer attended the University of Southern California.

Career
Hammer was a basketball player at the University of Southern California, and competed in volleyball at the 1964 Summer Olympics. As an actor, he played the role of Captain Richard "Dick" Hammer in the first season of the Jack Webb produced television show Emergency!, which debuted on January 15, 1972. He left the show midway through the first season, because he felt that being a real-life firefighter was more rewarding than playing a fictional one. He returned to the LACoFD and retired with the rank of captain.

Hammer portrayed the Marlboro Man in cigarette advertisements in the 1970s.

Personal life
Hammer's grandson is former University of Southern California starting quarterback and current Carolina Panthers quarterback Sam Darnold. Hammer's granddaughter, Franki Darnold, is a record holder for the University of Rhode Island women's volleyball team.

He died in Long Beach from prostate cancer at the age of 69. Other sources cite the cause of death (as with other former "Marlboro Men") as lung cancer.

References

External links
 

1930 births
1999 deaths
American men's volleyball players
Olympic volleyball players of the United States
Volleyball players at the 1964 Summer Olympics
American firefighters
American male television actors
20th-century American male actors
Male actors from Los Angeles
Deaths from lung cancer in California
USC Trojans men's basketball players